Mircəlal (known as Kirovkənd or Kirovka until 1991) is a village and municipality in the Saatly Rayon of Azerbaijan.  It has a population of 4,123.

References 

Populated places in Saatly District